Cuvier is both a French surname and a given name. Notable people with the name include:

Surname:
 Frédéric Cuvier (1773–1838), French zoologist
 Georges Cuvier (1769–1832), French naturalist and zoologist
 Sébastien Cuvier (born 1970), French footballer

Given name:
 Cuvier Grover (1828–1885), U.S. Union Army officer during the American Civil War

French-language surnames